This is a list of audio productions based on spin offs from the long-running British science fiction television series Doctor Who produced by Big Finish Productions.

Overview
These are the season and episode counts for all seasons and series released , ordered by the date that they were initially released.

Ranges

Bernice Summerfield (1998–2018)

Season 1 (1998–2000)

Season 2 (2000–2001)

Season 3 (2002–2003)

Season 4 (2003–2004)

Season 5 (2004–2005)

Season 6 (2005–2006)

Season 7 (2006)

Season 8 (2007–2008)

Season 9 (2008)

Season 10 (2009)

Season 11 (2010)

Boxset 1: Epoch (2011)

Boxset 2: Road Trip (2012)

Boxset 3: Legion (2012)

Boxset 4: New Frontiers (2013)

Boxset 5: Missing Persons (2013)

Boxset 6: The Story So Far (2018)

Specials (1998–2012)

Dalek Empire (2001–2008)

Series 1 (2001)

Series 2 (2003)

Series 3 (2004)

Series 4 (2007–2008)

Sarah Jane Smith (2002–2006)

Series 1 (2002)

Series 2 (2006)

Gallifrey (2004–present)

Series 1 (2004)

Series 2 (2005)

Series 3 (2006)

Series 4 (2011)

Series 5 (2013)

Series 6 (2013)

Series 7 (2015)

Series 8 (2016)

Series 9: Time War – Volume 1 (2018)

Series 10: Time War – Volume 2 (2019)

Series 11: Time War – Volume 3 (2020)

Series 12: Time War – Volume 4 (2021)

Series 13: War Room 1: Allegiance (2022)

Series 14: War Room 2

Series 15: War Room 3

Series 16: War Room 4

UNIT (2004–present)

Series 1 (2004–05)

Special (2012)

Brave New World (2022)

Cyberman (2005–2009)

Series 1 (2005–2006)

Series 2 (2009)

Iris Wildthyme (2005–2015)

Series 1 (2005)

Series 2 (2009)

Special (2009)

Series 3 (2012)

Series 4 (2013)

Wildthyme Reloaded (2015)

I, Davros (2006–2012)

Series 1 (2006)

Special (2012)

Jago & Litefoot (2010–present)

Series 1 (2010)

Series 2 (2011)

Series 3 (2011)

Series 4 (2012)

The Voyages of Jago & Litefoot (2012)

Series 5 (2013)

Series 6 (2013)

Series 7 (2014)

Series 8 (2014)

Series 9 (2015)

Series 10 (2015)

Jago & Litefoot & Strax (2015)

Series 11 (2016)

Series 12 (2016)

Series 13 (2017)

Special (2018)

Series 14 (2021)

Graceless (2010–2017)

Series 1 (2010)

Series 2 (2012)

Series 3 (2013)

Series 4 (2017)

Counter-Measures (2012–2015)

Continuing the story of several characters from the serial Remembrance of the Daleks (1988), the British government establishes a new organization called Counter-Measures to investigate reports of advanced technology, the supernatural and alien sightings.

Series 1 (2012)

Series 2 (2013)

Series 3 (2014)

Series 4 (2015)

Vienna (2013–2018)

Pilot (2013)

Series 1 (2014)

Series 2 (2015)

Series 3 (2016)

Series 4: Retribution (2018)

Charlotte Pollard (2014–2017)

Volume 1 (2014)

Volume 2 (2017)

The New Adventures of Bernice Summerfield (2014–present)

Volume 1 (2014)

Volume 2: The Triumph of Sutekh (2015)

Volume 3: The Unbound Universe (2016)

Volume 4: The Ruler of the Universe (2017)

Volume 5: Buried Memories (2019)

Volume 6: Lost in Translation (2020)

Volume 7: Blood & Steel (2022)

Torchwood (2015–present)

Main Range

2015

2016

2017

2018

2019

2020

2021

2022

2023

2024

Specials (2016–18)

Torchwood One

Series 1: Before the Fall (2017)

Series 2: Machines (2018)

Series 3: Latter Days (2019)

Series 4: Nightmares (2022)

The Story Continues

Series 1: Aliens Among Us (2017–18)

Series 2: God Among Us (2018–19)

Series 3: Among Us

The Sins of Captain John (2020)

Torchwood Soho

Series 1: Parasite (2020)

Series 2: Ashenden (2021)

Series 3: The Unbegotten (2022)

UNIT: The New Series (2015–present)

Series 1: Extinction (2015)

Series 2: Shutdown (2016)

Series 3: Silenced (2016)

Series 4: Assembled (2017)

Series 5: Encounters (2017)

Series 6: Cyber-Reality (2018)

Series 7: Revisitations (2018)

Series 8: Incursions (2019)

Nemesis 1: Between Two Worlds (2021)

Nemesis 2: Agents of the Vulpreen (2022)

Nemesis 3: Objective – Earth (2022)

Nemesis 4: Masters of Time

The Diary of River Song (2015–present)

Series 1 (2015)

Series 2 (2016)

Series 3 (2018)

Series 4 (2018)

Series 5 (2019)

Series 6 (2019)

Series 7 (2020)

Series 8 (2021)

Series 9: New Recruit (2021)

Series 10: Two Rivers and a Firewall (2022)

Series 11: Friend of the Family (2023)

The Churchill Years (2016–2018)

Volume 1 (2016)

Volume 2 (2018)

The New Counter-Measures (2016–2020)

Specials (2016)

Series 1 (2016)

Series 2 (2017)

Series 3 (2019–20)

The Lives of Captain Jack (2017–2020)

Volume 1 (2017)

Volume 2 (2019)

Volume 3 (2020)

The War Master (2017–present)

Series 1: Only the Good (2017)

Series 2: The Master of Callous (2018)

Series 3: Rage of the Time Lords (2019)

Series 4: Anti-Genesis (2019)

Series 5: Hearts of Darkness (2020)

Series 6: Killing Time (2021)

Series 7: Self-Defence (2022)

Series 8: Escape from Reality

Series 9: Solitary Confinement

Series 10: Rogue Encounters

Series 11: Future Phantoms

Tales from New Earth (2018)

Jenny: The Doctor's Daughter (2018–present)

Series 1 (2018)

Series 2: Still Running (2021)

Class (2018–present)

Volume 1 (2018)

Volume 2 (2018)

Volume 3 (2020)

Volume 4 (2020)

Secret Diary of a Rhodian Prince (2023)

Lady Christina (2018–present)

Series 1 (2018)

Series 2 (2021)

Missy (2019–present)

Series 1 (2019)

Series 2 (2020)

Series 3: Missy and the Monk (2021)

The Eighth of March (2019–present)

Series 1 (2019)

Series 2: Protectors of Time (2022)

Series 3: Strange Chemistry

The Paternoster Gang (2019–present)

Heritage 1 (2019)

Heritage 2 (2019)

Heritage 3 (2020)

Heritage 4 (2020)

Trespassers 1

Trespassers 2

Trespassers 3

Trespassers 4

Rose Tyler: The Dimension Cannon (2019–present)

Volume 1 (2019)

Volume 2: Other Worlds (2022)

Volume 3: Trapped

The Robots (2019–present)

Series 1 (2019)

Series 2 (2020)

Series 3 (2020)

Series 4 (2021)

Series 5 (2022)

Series 6

Donna Noble: Kidnapped! (2020)

Susan's War (2020)

Master! (2021–present)

Series 1 (2021)

Series 2: Nemesis Express (2022)

The Lone Centurion (2021–present)

Volume 1 (2021)

Volume 2: Camelot (2022)

The Year of Martha Jones (2021–present)

Rani Takes on the World

Volume 1: Beyond Bannerman Road

Volume 2

Call Me Master 
On 23 April 2022, Big Finish announced two box sets starring Sacha Dhawan as his incarnation of the Master. Alongside The Fugitive Doctor Adventures, it is the first Big Finish Doctor Who production to be based upon the Chris Chibnall era.

Series 1

Series 2

See also
 Big Finish Productions
 Doctor Who spin-offs

Notes

References

External links
 Big Finish Productions — Big Finish's official page for their Doctor Who range
 Doctor Who page on BBC 7 Drama site
 The TARDIS Library — An expanded listing of Big Finish's Doctor Who audios, with cover images & user ratings/reviews.

 
Big Finish Productions
Audio plays by Big Finish
Doctor Who spin-offs
Doctor Who audio plays by Big Finish